The Spectre's Bride (literally "The Wedding Shirt") is a cantata for soloists, choir and orchestra op. 69 by Antonín Dvořák based on a literary model by Karel Jaromír Erben (1884).

History of origins and performance 
In 1883, Dvořák was invited to write a large orchestral oratorio for England to be performed at the Birmingham Triennial Music Festival. Dvořák had agreed with his librettist Marie Červinková-Riegrová to write an oratorio on a theme from Czech history, for example the story of St. Wenceslaus or Jan Hus. Finally he decided to write a literary work, the ballad The Spectre's Bride by Karel Jaromír Erben. He worked on his composition from April to November 1884, and the cantata was published by Alfred Novello the following year. It is scored for piccolo, two flutes, two oboes, English horn, three clarinets, two bassoons, four horns,
two trumpets, three trombones, tuba, timpani, triangle, tam-tam, bells, harp, first and second violins, violas, cellos, double basses + mixed choir + vocal soloists (soprano, tenor, bass)

Before the performance in England, the cantata was first presented twice on 28 and 29 March 1885 in Plzeň under the composer's direction. The success of the performances at the Birmingham Triennial Music Festival on 27 August this year - involving a 400-strong choir, a 150-strong orchestra and with Dvořák on the conductor's podium – exceeded all the composer's expectations. The work was already heard in Milwaukee on 2 December 1885, in Edinburgh on 1 February 1886, in London on 2 February 1886, in Glasgow on 11 and 13 February 1886 and in London on 13 February 1886. In March 1886, Brooklyn followed, on 23 March 1886 Dewsbury, on 24 March 1886 Leeds, on 17 April 1886 Hradec Králové, on 6 May 1886 Chicago, on 10 May 1886 Philadelphia, 13 May 1886 in Boston, etc.

Structure 
 Introduction
 Nr. 1. Choir: "Už jedenáctá odbila"
 Nr. 2. Soprano solo: "Žel bohu, žel, kde můj tatíček?"
 Nr. 3. Tenor and bass solo and Choir: "Pohnul se obraz na stěně"
 Nr. 4. Duett. Soprano and tenor solo: "Hoj, má panenko, tu jsem již!"
 Nr. 5. Bass solo and Choir: "Byla noc, byla hluboká"
 Nr. 6. Bass solo and Choir: "A on tu napřed skok a skok"
 Nr. 7. Duett. soprano and tenor solo: "Pěkná noc, jasná"
 Nr. 8. Bass solo and Choir: "Knížky ji vzal a zahodil"
 Nr. 9. Bass solo and Choir: "A on vždy napřed – skok a skok"
 Nr. 10. Duett. soprano and tenor solo: "Pěkná noc, jasná, v tento čas"
 Nr. 11. Bass solo and Choir: "A byla cesta nížinou" 
 Nr. 12. Duett. Soprano and tenor solo: "Pěkná noc, jasná, v tu dobu"
 Nr. 13. Bass solo and Choir: "Tu na planině široké"
 Nr. 14. Duett. Soprano and tenor solo: "Hoj, má panenko, tu jsme již"
 Nr. 15. Bass solo and Choir: "Skokem přeskočil ohradu"
 Nr. 16. Bass solo and Choir: "A tu na dveře: buch, buch, buch!"
 Nr. 17. Sopran solo: "Maria Panno, při mně stůj"
 Nr. 18. Bass solo and Choir: '"A slyš, tu právě nablízce'"

Further reading 
 Daniela Philippi: Antonín Dvořák – Die Geisterbraut/Svatební košile op. 69 und Die heilige Ludmilla/Svatá Lumila op. 71. Studien zur großen Vokalform im 19. Jahrhundert (Mainzer Studien zur Musikwissenschaft, 30). Hans Schneider, Tutzing 1993, .

References

External links 
 
 The Spectre's Bride on IMSLP2

Operas by Antonín Dvořák
Czech-language operas
1884 operas
Adaptations of works by Karel Jaromír Erben